Artem Oleksiyovych Butenin (born 3 October 1989) is a Ukrainian former professional football defender.

Career

He is product of FC Dynamo Kyiv sportive school.

He was loaned to Volyn Lutsk in Ukrainian Premier League from July 2010.

In December 2015, he was disqualified for one year for doping.

References

External links 

1989 births
Living people
Footballers from Kyiv
Ukrainian footballers
Ukraine student international footballers
Ukraine under-21 international footballers
Ukraine youth international footballers
FC Dynamo-2 Kyiv players
FC Slovan Liberec players
FC Volyn Lutsk players
FC Poltava players
CSF Bălți players
Ravan Baku FC players
Ukrainian Premier League players
Ukrainian First League players
Association football defenders
Ukrainian expatriate footballers
Expatriate footballers in the Czech Republic
Ukrainian expatriate sportspeople in the Czech Republic
Expatriate footballers in Moldova
Ukrainian expatriate sportspeople in Moldova
Expatriate footballers in Azerbaijan
Ukrainian expatriate sportspeople in Azerbaijan
Doping cases in association football
Ukrainian sportspeople in doping cases